Michael J. Cook (born 25 January 1950) is an English former professional footballer who played in the Football League, as a forward. He began his youth career at Crystal Palace and signed professional terms in February 1968. He made just one League appearance in May of that year and in August 1969 moved on to Brentford where he played 20 times in season 1969–1970 (scoring four goals) before moving into non-league football with Folkestone.

References

1950 births
Living people
Footballers from Sutton, London
English footballers
Association football forwards
Crystal Palace F.C. players
Brentford F.C. players
Folkestone F.C. players
English Football League players